Neotimyra warkapiensis is a moth in the family Lecithoceridae. It was described by Kyu-Tek Park in 2011. It is found on New Guinea.

References

Moths described in 2011
Neotimyra